Tenggren is a Swedish surname. Notable people with the surname include:

Gustaf Tenggren (1896–1970), Swedish-American illustrator
Hans Tenggren (born 1949), Swedish racewalker

Swedish-language surnames